Iridomyrmex spadius is a species of ant in the genus Iridomyrmex. Described by Shattuck in 1993, localised populations of the species can be found in Queensland, Australia.

References

External links

Iridomyrmex
Hymenoptera of Australia
Insects described in 1993